The National Association of Fleet Administrators, Inc. (NAFA) is a not-for-profit, individual membership professional society for professionals who manage fleets of automobiles, SUVs, trucks, vans, and a wide range of specialized mobile equipment for organizations in the United States and Canada.

History
NAFA was founded in 1957.  The association provides its members a range of services, including certification, statistical research, monthly and annual publications, regional chapter meetings, government representation, annual conferences and trade shows, and also educational seminars.

Scope
NAFA's members are responsible for the specification, acquisition, maintenance and disposal of more than 3.5 million vehicles — including 1.1 million trucks. Across the North American continent, NAFA members have more than 350,000 medium- and heavy-duty trucks in their fleets, totaling for more than $21 billion in assets for medium- and heavy-duty trucks alone.

Fleet Types
The more “traditional” fleet vehicles of passenger cars, vans, and SUVs managed by NAFA members total 1.4 million and account for $45 billion in assets, as well as a quarter million police sedans; 58,000-plus emergency vehicles; and 386,000 pieces of specialty equipment used by public service and commercial fleets.

External links

Organizations established in 1957
Professional associations based in the United States
Fleet management